Colonel Henry Cecil Lowther, DL, JP (27 July 1790 – 6 December 1867) was an English Conservative politician and an amateur cricketer who played first-class cricket from 1819 to 1843. His long service in the House of Commons saw him become the Father of the House.

Early life 
Lowther was born on 27 July 1790 at Lowther Castle, Westmorland.  He was the second son of William Lowther, 1st Earl of Lonsdale, and his wife Lady Augusta (née Fane) (eldest daughter of John Fane, 9th Earl of Westmorland and, his first wife, Augusta Bertie, a granddaughter of Robert Bertie, 1st Duke of Ancaster and Kesteven).
 
Lowther was Educated at Westminster School

Career
He entered the army on 16 July 1807 as a cornet in the 7th Hussars. He was promoted lieutenant on 21 July 1808 and captain on 4 October 1810. He served with the 7th Hussars during the campaign of 1809 in Spain, including the battles of Mayorga, Sahagún, Benevente, and the retreat to Corunna. From 1812 until 1814, he was in Wellington's army during the Peninsular War, and was made a major in the 10th Hussars on 12 November 1815. He received the Peninsular Medal with three clasps after the war. On 20 April 1817 he went into the 12th Regiment of Foot as a lieutenant-colonel, with which rank he retired on half-pay. In 1830, he transferred to the 44th Foot. He raised six part-time Troops of Westmorland Yeomanry Cavalry across Westmorland and Cumberland at his own expense in 1819 and commanded them until he was appointed colonel of the Royal Cumberland Militia in 1830.

Political career
First elected in 1812 for Westmorland, a constituency long in the family interest, he continued to be returned until his death on 6 December 1867 at Barleythorpe Hall, Rutland. In 1862, he became Father of the House. He was the last MP elected during the reign of George III.

Cricket career
Between 1818 and 1839, Lowther played in 47 first-class cricket matches. A right-handed batsman and right arm slow roundarm bowler, he played most frequently for MCC. He played for the Gentlemen in the Gentlemen v Players series and also played once for both Hampshire and Surrey sides.

Personal life
On 19 May 1817, Lowther was married to Lady Lucy Eleanor Sherard, daughter of Philip Sherard, 5th Earl of Harborough and the former Eleanor Monckton (second daughter and co-heiress of Col. Hon. John Monckton of Fineshade Abbey, eldest son, by his second wife, of John Monckton, 1st Viscount Galway). Together, they were the parents of seven children, three sons and four daughters, including:

 Lady Eleanor Cecily Lowther (d. 1894), who married John Talbot Clifton, eldest son and heir of Thomas Clifton of Clifton Hall and Lytham Hall, in 1844.
 Lady Augusta Mary Lowther (d. 1916), who married the Hon. Gerard Noel, a son of Charles Noel, 1st Earl of Gainsborough.
 Henry Lowther, 3rd Earl of Lonsdale (1818–1876), who married Emily Susan Caulfeild, the daughter of St George Caulfeild of Donamon Castle.
 Arthur Lowther (1820–1855), who died unmarried.
 William Lowther (1821–1912), who married Hon. Charlotte Alice Parke, third daughter and co-heiress of James Parke, 1st Baron Wensleydale, in 1853.
 Constantia Lowther (1831–1864), who married Maj.-Gen. Robert Blücher Wood, fifth son of Col. Thomas Wood and wife Lady Caroline Stewart (a daughter of Robert Stewart, 1st Marquess of Londonderry) in 1850.

Lady Lucy died 8 June 1848. Lowther died on 6 December 1867. In 1873, his children were granted the style and precedence of the younger son of an Earl by Royal Warrant.

Notes

References

External links 
 

1790 births
1867 deaths
7th Queen's Own Hussars officers
10th Royal Hussars officers
Suffolk Regiment officers
British Militia officers
British Army personnel of the Napoleonic Wars
Conservative Party (UK) MPs for English constituencies
People educated at Westminster School, London
UK MPs 1812–1818
UK MPs 1818–1820
UK MPs 1820–1826
UK MPs 1826–1830
UK MPs 1830–1831
UK MPs 1831–1832
UK MPs 1832–1835
UK MPs 1835–1837
UK MPs 1837–1841
UK MPs 1841–1847
UK MPs 1847–1852
UK MPs 1852–1857
UK MPs 1857–1859
UK MPs 1859–1865
UK MPs 1865–1868
Younger sons of earls
44th Regiment of Foot officers
Westmorland and Cumberland Yeomanry officers
English cricketers
English cricketers of 1787 to 1825
English cricketers of 1826 to 1863
Marylebone Cricket Club cricketers
Gentlemen cricketers
Hampshire cricketers
Surrey cricketers
Henry
A to K v L to Z cricketers
Fast v Slow cricketers